= Modulated Noise Reference Unit =

Modulated Noise Reference Unit (MNRU) is an ITU standard (ITU P.810). The MNRU is, as the name implies, a noise model that utilizes speech as well as noise as input. The modulated output noise is a result of a combination of the input speech and noise, where the input speech is used to modulate the input noise. MNRU is mainly used in the telecommunication industry. MNRU is also sometimes referred to as Schröder Noise.
